The Buffet (Arabic: البوفيه Il-Bufayh) is a 1968 one-act play by Ali Salem which is widely regarded as a classic of modern Egyptian theatre. The Buffet was written in 1967, first performed at the Hakim Theatre in Cairo in March 1968, published in Arabic in 1969, and in English translation in 1973 by John Waterbury. The term al-Būfīh in Arabic refers to an office canteen or snack bar, although the play is set not down in the canteen, but upstairs in the office of the theatre manager. The cast requires only three actors: a theatre manager in an unnamed Kafkaesque authoritarian state, a playwright trying to get his play produced, and the waiter who brings food up from the buffet below. These characters symbolize the human contract between the powerful (the manager) and the powerless (the playwright) and the waiter (brute force).

References

1968 plays
Egyptian plays